The 1984 Embassy World Darts Championship was held from 31 December 1983 to 7 January 1984 at Jollees Cabaret Club in Stoke-on-Trent.

Eric Bristow made up for his defeat against Keith Deller in the previous year's final by winning his third world title having dropped just one set in the entire tournament. He beat Finn Jensen, Rick Ney, Peter Locke and John Lowe before defeating Dave Whitcombe in the final by 7 sets to 1.

Deller suffered a shock first-round defeat to 1978 semi-finalist Nicky Virachkul, who eventually lost to Whitcombe in the quarter-finals. Whitcombe then came from 4–2 down to beat Jocky Wilson 6–5 in the semi-finals. In a famous moment at the end of the match, Wilson drunkenly fell down on the stage before congratulating Whitcombe.

Seeds
  Eric Bristow
  Jocky Wilson
  Dave Whitcombe
  Cliff Lazarenko
  John Lowe
  Keith Deller
  Stefan Lord
  Bobby George

Prize money
The prize fund was £36,200.

Champion: £9,000
Runner-Up: £4,000
Semi-Finalists (2): £2,250
Quarter-Finalists (4): £1,250
Last 16 (8): £750
Last 32 (16): £450

There was also a 9-Dart Checkout prize of £52,000, along with a High Checkout prize of £800.

The Results

References

BDO World Darts Championships
BDO World Darts 1984
Bdo World Darts Championship, 1984
Bdo World Darts Championship
Bdo World Darts Championship